Zaytoun is a British non-profit organisation which supports Palestinian farming communities by helping to increase the market for their olive oil products internationally, and by helping the farmers improve the quality of their oil through training and equipment provision.

History 
A trading company named Zaytoun Limited was established in 2004, and converted to a community interest company in 2008.

Zaytoun is supported by UK charity War on Want, amongst others. They were awarded Fairtrade certification for their olive oil in 2009.

In 2020, the company had net assets of £347,000, mostly in stocks of goods. In that year there were eight employees.

Operations
Zaytoun imports and distributes olive oil to retail and wholesale customers, in addition to regional fair-trade and Palestine campaign groups. Jewish, Muslim and Christian faith groups have also taken an interest, ordering the oil for their places of worship and to sell at local stalls as part of a message of inter-faith peace promotion.

Any profits Zaytoun makes are invested in product development in partnership with their suppliers, in local producer support projects run by NGOs such as Oxfam and War on Want, put back into acquiring more stock to meet growing demand and invested in working with a volunteer harvest team.

Zaytoun supports Palestinian producers by selling other artisan produce, including dates and almonds.

References

External links 
 

Organizations based in the State of Palestine
Olive oil